The National Assembly is the unicameral parliament and legislative body of the Republic of Bulgaria. The first National Assembly was established in 1879 with the Tarnovo Constitution.

During the communist period between 1946 and 1989, the National Assembly had been characterized as a rubber stamp for the Bulgarian Communist Party (BCP) or as only being able to affect issues of low sensitivity and salience to the Bulgarian communist regime. The BCP controlled nomination and election processes at every level in its political system, allowing it to stamp out any opposition.

Ordinary National Assembly
The National Assembly consists of 240 members elected for a four-year term, elected by proportional representation in multi-seat constituencies. Political parties must garner a minimum of 4% of the national vote in order to enter the Assembly. Bulgaria has a multi-party system.

The Assembly is responsible for enactment of laws, approval of the budget, scheduling of presidential elections, selection and dismissal of the Prime Minister and other ministers, declaration of war, concluding peace and deployment of troops outside Bulgaria, and ratification of international treaties and agreements. It is headed and presided by the Chairperson of the National Assembly of Bulgaria.

The Assembly administers the publication of the State Gazette, Bulgaria's gazette of record.

Procedure

By the Constitution, the National Assembly is inaugurated by the eldest elected member of Parliament. On the first day of sitting, they preside over the election of the Speaker (Chairperson) and two deputies.

Once elected, the Speakers retain their party allegiances, which means that they remain as MPs and are allowed to take part in debates and voting.

121 MPs must be present in order for any session to commence, and 50%+1 of those present must vote "for" any point of order or bill to be approved.

Ministers may be chosen from among the MPs or they may be experts outside Parliament. All MPs picked to be Cabinet ministers lose their MP status, and other members from their party are called up to Parliament to fill the seats they vacate.

Parliament sits Wednesday to Friday, and sessions begin at 9 am. Parliamentary committees sit in the afternoons.

Layout

Old Parliament House

In 2020-2021, the old Parliament House was only used for special occasions, such as the opening and closing of the legislative session or the inauguration of a new president. Following the April 2021 parliamentary elections, the legislature returned to the old parliament building.

The Chamber is made up of 286 seats, all facing the 5-seat speaker's bench in a 26 x 11 arrangement. In front of the Speaker, also facing the chamber, is the pulpit, in front of which is the stenographers' desk.

Parties sit in parliamentary groups, loosely following the rule that the political left sits to the Speaker's left and the political right to his right. Generally, the largest parties choose the chamber's left,center or centre wings, with smaller blocks accommodating wherever convenient. Individual MPs will sometimes sit entirely outside their block or stand, and, since compulsory electronic registration was implemented, may even vote from any seat in the house.

To the speaker's right, also facing the chamber, is a section with 17 seats reserved for the Cabinet, any of whom may or may not be present at any time during a parliamentary session. Any of them may, however, be called up by Parliament at any time if needed.

Largo Parliament House

Located in the former Bulgarian Communist Party headquarters building in the Largo, The Chamber is made up of 270 seats arranged in a hemicycle of twelve rows, all facing the 7-seat speaker's bench. In front of the Speaker, also facing the chamber, is the pulpit containing a stenographer's desk at the center and two sections reserved for the Cabinet, each with 13 seats, at the sides.

The new plenary hall, which is located under a glass roof, is larger than the old one and can be easily remodeled to fit the 400-member Grand National Assembly. It was used briefly in 2020-2021 during the end of GERB's third government. Following the April 2021 parliamentary elections, the legislature returned to the old parliament building.

Grand National Assembly

In addition to the ordinary National Assembly, a Grand National Assembly (Велико народно събрание, Veliko narodno sabranie) may be convened for matters of special jurisdiction, such as: 1) Adoption of a new Constitution; 2) Amendment of specific articles of the Constitution, e.g. those related with the basic civil rights; 3) Changes in the territory (gain or loss) of the Republic, etc. Before the World War II the Grand National Assembly was also competent in electing the Regency of the Bulgarian Kingdom if the tzar had not come to age. The First and the Third Grand National Assemblies also elected the first two Bulgarian monarchs after the liberation from Ottoman rule – Prince (Knjaz) Alexander Battenberg and Prince (Knjaz) Ferdinand Saxe Coburg-Gotha.

As an organ, the Grand National Assembly was introduced with the Tarnovo Constitution of 1879, abolished in 1947 and reintroduced with the 1991 constitution. In different constitutional provisions, it was constituted by a different number of representatives. According to the 1991 Constitution, it consists of 400 deputies (as opposed to 240 in the ordinary one). The 1991 Constitution was adopted by the Seventh Grand National Assembly and was composed of 200 members being elected by proportional representation and the other 200 under a first-past-the-post voting system. The Constitution provides that the elections for Grand National Assembly shall be conducted in the same manner as those for the Ordinary National Assembly.

A qualified majority of 2/3 during three voting procedures on separate dates is required for a decision to be made. The Grand National Assembly can also serve as an ordinary National Assembly, taking care of regular legislative activities in urgent cases only. After it has concluded its work on the matter for which it was elected, the Grand National Assembly has dissolved ex lege and the President of the Republic shall appoint elections for an ordinary National Assembly.

A total of seven Grand National Assemblies have been in operation in Bulgaria, the last one from 10 July 1990 to 12 July 1991 adopting the current constitution.

Building

The National Assembly's main building has been proclaimed a monument of culture for its historic significance. Situated in downtown Sofia, it was designed in Neo-Renaissance style by Konstantin Jovanović.

Due to insufficient space in the main building at Parliament Square, the National Assembly is now housed by the former headquarters of the Bulgarian Communist Party, located at the Largo - the so-called Party House. Initially, only administrative offices have been relocated, but proposals to convert the into an interior space for the plenary chamber have been made since 1996, with the relocation taking place in 2020. After the April 2021 Bulgarian parliamentary election, the National Assembly moved again to the old Parliament House because ITN, Democratic Bulgaria, ISMV, and DPS viewed the Party House building as a symbol of Bulgaria's communist past.

List of National Assemblies

See also 

Politics of Bulgaria
List of legislatures by country

Notes

External links 

 
 Bulgaria The National Assembly
 Historical photographs of the National Assembly

 
1991 establishments in Bulgaria
Bulgaria
Bulgaria
Bulgaria